Alexander Alexandrovich Nevsky (born Alexander Alexandrovich Kuritsyn; 17 July 1971) is a Russian bodybuilder, actor, writer, and producer. He is known for playing the role of Vlad Stepanov in Moscow Heat. At the age of 25 he changed his surname from Kuritsyn to Nevsky.

He is also a member of the Hollywood Foreign Press Association and a voter for the Golden Globes.

Early years
According to his interview "The Saga of the Winner" in the magazine "Flesh and Blood" in 1997 (number 2), Alexander is the youngest child in the family. Father - Alexander Nikolaevich Kuritsyn, master of sports in basketball; taught economics at MGIMO. Mother - Evgenia Yanovna Kuritsyna, an instrument-making engineer by education.

Personal life

Filmography

References

External links

 
 

1971 births
21st-century Russian male actors
Living people
Male actors from Moscow
Male screenwriters
Russian activists against the 2022 Russian invasion of Ukraine
Russian film directors
Russian film producers
Russian male film actors
Russian male television actors
Russian male writers
Russian screenwriters
Russian stunt performers